Zhylyoi District is a district located in the south-eastern region of Atyrau Region in Kazakhstan. The administrative center of the district is the town of Kulsary. Population:

History 
The district was formed in 1928 under the name Zhilokosinsky district. In 1963 it was renamed into Embinsky district. The current name is from October 7, 1993.

References

Districts of Kazakhstan
Atyrau Region